Borden County is a rural county located in the U.S. state of Texas.  It is in West Texas and its county seat is Gail.

As of the 2020 census, its population was 631, making it the fifth-least populous county in Texas. Borden is one of five remaining prohibition or entirely dry counties in the state of Texas.

The county was created in 1876 and later organized in 1891. Gail and Borden County are named for Gail Borden Jr., businessman, publisher, surveyor, and inventor of condensed milk.

History

Native Americans

Shoshone and the Penateka band of Comanches were early tribes in the area.

County established

Borden County was created in 1876 from Bosque County and named for Gail Borden Jr., the inventor of condensed milk.  Borden was publisher and editor of the Telegraph and Texas Register, as well as a political leader in the Republic of Texas.  The county was organized in 1891, and Gail was made the county seat.

Farmers and ranchers settled the county, but the population remained relatively small. In 1902, Texas placed lands in the public domain and spurred a land rush in Borden County. Many of the newcomers grew cotton.

Borden County has had two courthouses, one built in 1890. The current courthouse is of brick and concrete construction and was erected in 1939. The architect was David S. Castle Co.

Oil was discovered in the county in 1949.

Geography

Major highways
  U.S. Highway 180
  Farm to Market Road 669

Adjacent counties
 Garza County (north)
 Scurry County (east)
 Mitchell County (southeast)
 Howard County (south)
 Martin County (southwest)
 Dawson County (west)
 Lynn County (northwest)

Demographics

Note: the US Census treats Hispanic/Latino as an ethnic category. This table excludes Latinos from the racial categories and assigns them to a separate category. Hispanics/Latinos can be of any race.

As of the census of 2000,  729 people, 292 households, and 216 families resided in the county.  The population density was 0.80 people per square mile (0.31/km)2.  The 435 housing units averaged 0.48 per square mile (0.19/km2).  The racial makeup of the county was 90.53% White, 0.14% African American, 0.27% Native American, 6.31% from other races, and 2.74% from two or more races.  About 11.93% of the population was Hispanic or Latino of any race.

Of the 292 households, 30.10% had children under the age of 18 living with them, 65.10% were married couples living together, 6.20% had a female householder with no husband present, and 25.70% were not families. Around 22.60% of all households consisted of individuals, and 9.20% had someone living alone who was 65 years of age or older.  The average household size was 2.50 and the average family size was 2.93.

In the county, the population was distributed as 24.60% under the age of 18, 6.70% from 18 to 24, 27.40% from 25 to 44, 25.00% from 45 to 64, and 16.30% who were 65 years of age or older.  The median age was 40 years. For every 100 females, there were 103.10 males.  For every 100 females age 18 and over, there were 108.30 males.

The median income for a household in the county was $29,205, and for a family was $36,458. Males had a median income of $25,556 versus $21,607 for females. The per capita income for the county was $18,364.  About 14.00% of the population and 11.80% of families were below the poverty line.  Of the total people living in poverty, 14.30% were under the age of 18 and 11.60% were 65 or older.

The county is served by nearby radio stations KBXJ (FM) and KPET (AM), and the various Midland and Odessa radio and TV stations.

The largest self-reported ancestry groups in Borden County are:
· English – 17%
· Irish – 15%
· German – 12%
· Mexican – 9%
· French (except Basque) – 3%
· Scotch-Irish – 3%
· Other Hispanic or Latino – 3%
· Scottish – 2%
· Spanish – 1%
· American Indian tribes, specified – 1%

Education

The county is served mostly by Borden County Independent School District. The district offers kindergarten through 12th grade. Borden County School is among the few public schools in Texas to receive a distinguished GreatSchools rating of 9 out of 10. Many of the teachers reside in board-owned housing in Gail. The school offers six-man football, basketball, baseball, tennis, softball, UIL, FFA, and track.

Media

The weekly newspaper, the Borden Star, covers events for the school and county.

Communities
 Gail (county seat)
 Mesquite (ghost town)
 Plains

Gallery

Politics
Borden County was President Trump's second strongest county in 2020, only slightly edged out by Roberts County in the same state.

See also 

 Dry counties
 Recorded Texas Historic Landmarks in Borden County

References

External links
Borden County government

Borden County from the Texas Almanac
Borden County from the TXGenWeb Project
Borden County Profile from the Texas Association of Counties

 
1891 establishments in Texas
Populated places established in 1891